Boots and Saddles may refer to:

 Boots and Saddles (bugle call)
 Boots and Saddles (TV series), an American Western television series
Boots and Saddles, 1909 film starring Hobart Bosworth
Boots and Saddles (1916 film), 1916 film produced by B. S. Moss
 Boots and Saddles (film), a 1937 American Western film